Marie Kreutzer is an Austrian filmmaker.

She studied at Vienna Film Academy with Walter Wippersberg.

Her films have been screened at the  Berlin International Film Festival, 70th San Sebastián International Film Festival, 2022 Cannes Film Festival, 2022 Toronto International Film Festival, and 2022 New York Film Festival.

Filmography 

 The Fatherless (“Die Vaterlosen”) 2011 
 Gruber Is Leaving (“Gruber Geht”) 2015 
 We Used to Be Cool (“Was Hat Uns Bloß So Ruiniert”) 2016 
 Die Notlüge (2017)
 The Ground Beneath My Feet 2019
 Corsage 2022

References 

Living people
Austrian film directors
Year of birth missing (living people)
Austrian women film directors